Timothy Meadows (born February 5, 1961) is an American actor, comedian, and writer. Meadows was one of the longest-running cast members on the NBC sketch comedy series Saturday Night Live, where he appeared for ten seasons from 1991 to 2000. For his work on SNL, he received a nomination for the Primetime Emmy Award for Outstanding Writing for a Variety Series in 1993. He played main character John Glascott on the ABC sitcom Schooled for its two-season run after playing the same character in a recurring role for six seasons on The Goldbergs.

Early life and education
Meadows was born in Highland Park, Michigan, the son of Mardell, a nurse's assistant, and Lathon Meadows, a janitor. He attended Pershing High School in Detroit and studied television and radio broadcasting at Wayne State University.

Career
Meadows began performing improvisational comedy at the Soup Kitchen Saloon. Meadows's start in show business was in Chicago as a member of The Second City comedy troupe alongside future star Chris Farley. In 1991, Meadows landed a spot on Saturday Night Live and would go on to become a longtime cast member, appearing on the program until 2000. (Meadows was on the show for ten seasons; this was the record for the longest tenure on the show until it was surpassed by Darrell Hammond in 2005, whose record was also surpassed by Kenan Thompson in 2017.) Meadows's lengthy tenure on the show was used as a gag in three monologues when former cast members Phil Hartman and Mike Myers returned to the show to host, and when Alec Baldwin hosted for his twelfth time.

Meadows often spoofed famous personalities including Oprah Winfrey, Erykah Badu, Michael Jackson, and Tiger Woods, on SNL, and one time was a quick change artist to pull off an impersonation of both O. J. Simpson and Al Cowlings within the timespan of one SNL skit. Some skits had Meadows playing a fictionalized version of himself, such as being a fan of ice hockey on Weekend Update stating his dissatisfaction with the 1994 NHL lockout and remarking "What am I supposed to do about this; watch basketball?" Another sketch as himself was introducing the entire SNL cast as their most famous characters, such as Wayne and Garth, or Melanie Hutsell as Jan Brady in a sing-a-long denouncing the 1992 Los Angeles riots, which ends with Meadows remarking "This is personal to me...mainly because I don't have an SNL character to play!" Eventually he did get an original character with Leon Phelps, "The Ladies' Man", a perpetually horny talk show host who falsely believed himself to be the living definition of what women search for in a man. The character was adapted into a 2000 film, The Ladies Man, which followed the character's attempts to find love and a suitable outlet for his beloved radio program. In 2001, he co-starred in Three Days; in 2003 he appeared as Miles McDermott in The Even Stevens Movie.

Meadows soon moved on to other projects, including a regular role on the short-lived NBC sitcom The Michael Richards Show and a supporting role in the 2004 film The Cookout. He also guest-starred as a client on the hit NBC comedy The Office in the second-season episode "The Client". He played a high school principal in Mean Girls, a film written by (and co-starring) fellow SNL cast member Tina Fey. He also had a part in Handsome Boy Modeling School's album White People. In 2007, he appeared in a substantial supporting role in Walk Hard: The Dewey Cox Story.

Meadows has appeared in other feature films, including Coneheads, It's Pat, and Wayne's World 2, all of which were based on popular SNL characters and had varying degrees of success. He co-starred in the 2006 film The Benchwarmers alongside his former SNL co-stars Rob Schneider and David Spade. He was also featured in CBS's Gameshow Marathon (summer 2006), has appeared on The Colbert Report in the recurring role of P.K. Winsome, a conservative pundit and entrepreneur (who made an appearance at the Rally to Restore Sanity and/or Fear), and starred in The Bill Engvall Show and Curb Your Enthusiasm. He was also a frequent guest on The Late Late Show with Craig Ferguson as a comic field reporter. On May 31, 2008, Meadows threw out a ceremonial first pitch and conducted the seventh-inning stretch at Wrigley Field during a Chicago Cubs game against the Colorado Rockies.

In 2014, Meadows co-starred alongside Casey Wilson and Ken Marino in the short-lived NBC sitcom Marry Me. He and Dan Bucatinsky played "The Kevins", the gay dads of Annie (played by Wilson) who are both named Kevin. Since 2013, he has appeared in a recurring role on the ABC sitcom The Goldbergs, playing Mr. Glascott, the high school's parrot-owning guidance counselor. In 2016, he began starring in the FOX live-action/animation hybrid Son of Zorn opposite Cheryl Hines and Jason Sudeikis. He also had a recurring role in Brooklyn Nine-Nine as Jake Peralta's cannibal prison cellmate.

Meadows is featured in season two of Netflix's Space Force starring Steve Carell.

Meadows continues to perform improv in Chicago and Los Angeles, most frequently at venues such as the ImprovOlympic and Upright Citizens Brigade Theatre. With Heather Anne Campbell and Miles Stroth, Meadows frequently performed in the improvised sketch show, Heather, Miles, and Tim in Los Angeles.

On February 17, 2023, Meadows was announced to reprise his role as Principal Ron Duvall from the first two Mean Girls films in the stage-to-screen adaptation of the Broadway musical (which in turn is based off the first film).

Personal life
Meadows married Michelle Taylor in 1997, and they had two sons together. They divorced in 2005.

Filmography

Film

Television

Web

References

External links

 Official website

1961 births
Living people
Male actors from Michigan
African-American male actors
African-American male comedians
American male comedians
African-American stand-up comedians
American stand-up comedians
American male film actors
American television writers
American male television writers
American male television actors
American male voice actors
People from Highland Park, Michigan
20th-century American male actors
21st-century American male actors
American sketch comedians
Wayne State University alumni
Screenwriters from Michigan
20th-century American comedians
21st-century American comedians
Pershing High School alumni
20th-century African-American people
21st-century African-American people